Boghossian, Bogossyan, Boghosian, Bogosyan, etc. is an Armenian surname, particularly associated with Western Armenia. The Eastern Armenian equivalent is Poghossyan. It is a patronymic from the first name Boghos (Armenian: Պողոս), equivalent to Paul, making the name effectively equivalent to Paulson.

Notable people with the name include:

Alain Boghossian, French-Armenian football player and now assistant coach for the French national team.
Paul Boghossian, professor of philosophy at New York University
Peter Boghossian, former professor of philosophy at Portland State University 
Joaquín Boghossian, Uruguayan professional footballer 
Alexander Boghossian, Armenian Ethiopian painter and art teacher
Edward K. Boghosian, founder of Armenian Reporter newspaper
Sam Boghosian, American-Armenian football player and coach
Zach Bogosian, American-Armenian professional ice hockey player 
Eric Bogosian, American-Armenian actor, playwright, monologist, and novelist
Raffi Boghosyan, Bulgarian-Armenian singer, winner of the first series of Bulgarian X Factor

Armenian-language surnames
Patronymic surnames
Surnames from given names